Boyle's law, also referred to as the Boyle–Mariotte law, or Mariotte's law (especially in France), is an experimental gas law that describes the relationship between pressure and volume of a confined gas. Boyle's law has been stated as:
The absolute pressure exerted by a given mass of an ideal gas is inversely proportional to the volume it occupies if the temperature and amount of gas remain unchanged within a closed system.Levine, Ira. N. (1978), p. 12 gives the original definition.
Mathematically, Boyle's law can be stated as:

or

Boyle's Law states that when the temperature of a given mass of confined gas is constant, the product of its pressure and volume is also constant. When comparing the same substance under two different sets of conditions, the law can be expressed as:
 

showing that as volume increases, the pressure of a gas decreases proportionally, and vice versa. Boyle's Law is named after  Robert Boyle, who published the original law in 1662.

History

 
The relationship between pressure and volume was first noted by Richard Towneley and Henry Power in the 17th century. Robert Boyle confirmed their discovery through experiments and published the results. According to Robert Gunther and other authorities, it was Boyle's assistant, Robert Hooke, who built the experimental apparatus.  Boyle's law is based on experiments with air, which he considered to be a fluid of particles at rest in between small invisible springs. Boyle may have begun experimenting with gases due to an interest in air as an essential element of life; for example, he published works on the growth of plants without air. Boyle used a closed J-shaped tube and after pouring mercury from one side he forced the air on the other side to contract under the pressure of mercury. After repeating the experiment several times and using different amounts of mercury he found that under controlled conditions, the pressure of a gas is inversely proportional to the volume occupied by it. 

The French physicist Edme Mariotte (1620–1684) discovered the same law independently of Boyle in 1679, after Boyle had published it in 1662. Mariotte did, however, discover that air volume changes with temperature. Thus this law is sometimes referred to as Mariotte's law or the Boyle–Mariotte law. Instead of a static theory, a kinetic theory is needed, which was provided two centuries later by Maxwell and Boltzmann.

This law was the first physical law to be expressed in the form of an equation describing the dependence of two variable quantities.

Definition 

The law itself can be stated as follows:

Or Boyle's law is a gas law, stating that the pressure and volume of a gas have an inverse relationship. If volume increases, then pressure decreases and vice versa, when the temperature is held constant.

Therefore, when the volume is halved, the pressure is doubled; and if the volume is doubled, the pressure is halved.

Relation with kinetic theory and ideal gases 
Boyle's law states that at constant temperature the volume of a given mass of a dry gas is inversely proportional to its pressure.

Most gases behave like ideal gases at moderate pressures and temperatures. The technology of the 17th century could not produce very high pressures or very low temperatures. Hence, the law was not likely to have deviations at the time of publication. As improvements in technology permitted higher pressures and lower temperatures, deviations from the ideal gas behavior became noticeable, and the relationship between pressure and volume can only be accurately described employing real gas theory.  The deviation is expressed as the compressibility factor.

Boyle (and  Mariotte) derived the law solely by experiment. The law can also be derived theoretically based on the presumed existence of atoms and molecules and assumptions about motion and perfectly elastic collisions (see kinetic theory of gases). These assumptions were met with enormous resistance in the positivist scientific community at the time, however, as they were seen as purely theoretical constructs for which there was not the slightest observational evidence.

Daniel Bernoulli (in 1737–1738) derived Boyle's law by applying Newton's laws of motion at the molecular level. It remained ignored until around 1845, when John Waterston published a paper building the main precepts of kinetic theory; this was rejected by the Royal Society of England. Later works of James Prescott Joule, Rudolf Clausius and in particular Ludwig Boltzmann firmly established the kinetic theory of gases and brought attention to both the theories of Bernoulli and Waterston.

The debate between proponents of energetics and atomism led Boltzmann to write a book in 1898, which endured criticism until his suicide in 1906. Albert Einstein in 1905 showed how kinetic theory applies to the Brownian motion of a fluid-suspended particle, which was confirmed in 1908 by Jean Perrin.

Equation

The mathematical equation for Boyle's law is:

where  denotes the pressure of the system,  denotes the volume of the gas,  is a constant value representative of the temperature and volume of the system.

So long as temperature remains constant the same amount of energy given to the system persists throughout its operation and therefore, theoretically, the value of  will remain constant. Forcing the volume  of the fixed quantity of gas to increase, keeping the gas at the initially measured temperature, the pressure  must decrease proportionally. Conversely, reducing the volume of the gas increases the pressure. Boyle's law is used to predict the result of introducing a change, in volume and pressure only, to the initial state of a fixed quantity of gas.

The initial and final volumes and pressures of the fixed amount of gas, where the initial and final temperatures are the same (heating or cooling will be required to meet this condition), are related by the equation:

 

Boyle's law, Charles's law, and Gay-Lussac's law form the combined gas law. The three gas laws in combination with Avogadro's law can be generalized by the ideal gas law.

Human breathing system

Boyle's law is often used as part of an explanation on how the breathing system works in the human body. This commonly involves explaining how the lung volume may be increased or decreased and thereby cause a relatively lower or higher air pressure within them (in keeping with Boyle's law). This forms a pressure difference between the air inside the lungs and the environmental air pressure, which in turn precipitates either inhalation or exhalation as air moves from high to low pressure.

See also
Related phenomena:
 Water thief
 Industrial Revolution
 Steam engine

Other gas laws:

Citations

External links
 

Gas laws
Pressure
Volume
Scientific laws

de:Thermische Zustandsgleichung idealer Gase#Gesetz von Boyle-Mariotte